is a Japanese cross-country skier and biathlete. She competed in the cross-country skiing at the 1998 Winter Olympics and the 2002 Winter Olympics and in the biathlon at the 2006 Winter Olympics.

References

External links
 

1976 births
Living people
Cross-country skiers at the 1998 Winter Olympics
Cross-country skiers at the 2002 Winter Olympics
Biathletes at the 2006 Winter Olympics
Japanese female biathletes
Japanese female cross-country skiers
Olympic biathletes of Japan
Olympic cross-country skiers of Japan
Sportspeople from Hokkaido
Universiade gold medalists for Japan
Universiade medalists in cross-country skiing
Competitors at the 1997 Winter Universiade